Lubys Cabinet was the 5th cabinet of Lithuania since 1990. It consisted of the Prime Minister and 17 government ministers.

History
After the 1992 Lithuanian parliamentary election, Democratic Labour Party of Lithuania (LDDP) had the majority in the Lithuanian parliament, the Seimas. The leader of the LDDP, Algirdas Brazauskas was elected the Speaker of the Sixth Seimas and assumed the role of the acting president. Brazauskas appointed an independent business manager (and former Deputy Prime Minister in Abišala Cabinet) Bronislovas Lubys as the Prime Minister on 12 December 1992. It was understood that Lubys Cabinet would be short-lived as it would have to return its mandate after the presidential elections in early 1993. The government received its mandate and started its work on 17 December 1992, after the Seimas gave assent to its program.

The government served until the presidential elections, returning its mandate on 26 February 1993. The government continued to serve in an acting capacity  until Šleževičius Cabinet started its work on 31 March 1993.

Cabinet
The following ministers served on the Lubys Cabinet.

References 

Cabinet of Lithuania
1992 establishments in Lithuania
1993 disestablishments in Lithuania
Cabinets established in 1992
Cabinets disestablished in 1993